John Laurie Boulevard / McKnight Boulevard is a major east-west arterial road and expressway in north Calgary, Alberta. The two roadways function together as a major crosstown route between the northwest and northeast quadrants and are part of Calgary's Skeletal Road Network.

Route description

John Laurie Boulevard 
John Laurie Boulevard continues east along the southern edge of Nose Hill Park to its eastern terminus at McKnight Boulevard. 

The road is named for John Lee Laurie, a prominent educator and political activist in Calgary, best known for First Nations advocacy.

McKnight Boulevard 

It is named for William Lidstone McKnight (1918–1941), a World War II flying ace with the Royal Air Force who had spent much of his childhood in Calgary before disappearing shortly after the Battle of Britain in combat.  Prior to the road being renamed in his honour, the portion of the road west of what is now Deerfoot Trail conformed to Calgary's street numbering system, and was known as 48 Avenue N, while the eastern portion was part of Edmonton Trail until the city's road network in the northeast portion of the city was revised in the 1960s.

Future 
Increased traffic along John Laurie and McKnight Boulevards has led to increased demands for improvements along the corridor.  The City of Calgary has identified the intersection of 12 Street NE, just east of Deerfoot Trail, for a future interchange location; however, no timeline has been set for construction. There has also been renewed demand to improve the John Laurie Boulevard / McKnight Boulevard / 48 Avenue NW intersection; an interchange was proposed in 2005 but ultimately went unfunded.

Major intersections
From west to east.

See also

Transportation in Calgary

References

Roads in Calgary